Whiting is a town in Washington County, Maine, United States. The town was named after Tate Whiting, an early settler. The population was 482 at the 2020 census. The town was originally known as Orangetown.

Geography

Demographics

2010 census
As of the census of 2010, there were 487 people, 206 households, and 145 families living in the town. The racial makeup of the town was 93.6% White, 0.2% African American, 1.2% Native American, 2.3% Asian, 0.8% from other races, and 1.8% from two or more races. Hispanic or Latino of any race were 1.2% of the population.

There were 206 households, of which 27.2% had children under the age of 18 living with them, 59.2% were married couples living together, 6.8% had a female householder with no husband present, 4.4% had a male householder with no wife present, and 29.6% were non-families. 24.3% of all households were made up of individuals, and 8.7% had someone living alone who was 65 years of age or older. The average household size was 2.36 and the average family size was 2.78.

The median age in the town was 48 years. 21.1% of residents were under the age of 18; 6.3% were between the ages of 18 and 24; 17.1% were from 25 to 44; 40.8% were from 45 to 64; and 15% were 65 years of age or older. The gender makeup of the town was 49.5% male and 50.5% female.

2000 census
As of the census of 2000, there were 430 people, 181 households, and 116 families living in the town.  The population density was 9.2 people per square mile (3.5/km).  There were 342 housing units at an average density of 7.3 per square mile (2.8/km).  The racial makeup of the town was 98.14% White, 0.70% Native American, 0.23% Asian, and 0.93% from two or more races. Hispanic or Latino of any race were 0.23% of the population.

There were 181 households, out of which 24.3% had children under the age of 18 living with them, 59.1% were married couples living together, 3.9% had a female householder with no husband present, and 35.4% were non-families. 28.7% of all households were made up of individuals, and 12.2% had someone living alone who was 65 years of age or older.  The average household size was 2.34 and the average family size was 2.87.

In the town, the population was spread out, with 20.9% under the age of 18, 6.7% from 18 to 24, 25.6% from 25 to 44, 29.5% from 45 to 64, and 17.2% who were 65 years of age or older.  The median age was 43 years. For every 100 females, there were 110.8 males.  For every 100 females age 18 and over, there were 106.1 males.

The median income for a household in the town was $28,304, and the median income for a family was $35,673. Males had a median income of $25,625 versus $18,750 for females. The per capita income for the town was $13,771.  About 15.3% of families and 22.2% of the population were below the poverty line, including 36.6% of those under age 18 and 11.4% of those age 65 or over.

Economy

There is one active refueling area and rest stop in the town.
There is also a small gift shop.
Near the water is a bed and breakfast.

References

Towns in Washington County, Maine
Towns in Maine